Snake shot (also commonly known as rat shot and dust shot) refers to handgun and rifle cartridges loaded with lead shot canisters instead of bullets, much like large caliber canister shot. Snake shot is generally used for shooting snakes, rodents, birds, and other pests at very close range. The most common snake shot cartridge is .22 Long Rifle loaded with No. 12 shot.

Uses 

Snake shot is generally used for shooting at snakes, rodents, birds, and other pests at very close ranges. Used as foraging ammunition by hikers, backpackers and campers, snake shot is ideally suited for use in derringers and revolvers (especially "kit guns"), chambered for .22 Long Rifle, .38 Special, or .357 Magnum. Snake shot may not cycle properly in semi-automatic pistols.  

Shot shells have also been historically issued to soldiers, to be used in standard issue rifles. The .45-70 "forager" round, which contained a thin wooden bullet filled with birdshot, was intended for hunting small game to supplement the soldiers' rations. This round in effect made the .45-70 rifle into a small gauge shotgun, capable of killing rabbits, ducks, and other small game.

During World War II, the United States military developed the .45 ACP M12 and M15 shot shells cartridges. They were issued to pilots, to be used as foraging ammunition in the event that they were shot down. The M15 cartridges were loaded with 118 pellets of No. 7 1/2 birdshot. The boxes were marked "For use in hunting small game effective range 25 feet [8 m]". While they were best used in the M1917 revolvers, the M15 cartridge would actually cycle the semi-automatic M1911 pistol's action. The current CCI .45 ACP shotshell cartridge is virtually identical to these rounds.

Snake shot shells 

Both Winchester and Federal make star-crimped .22 Long Rifle snake shot loaded with No. 12 shot. These cartridges resemble traditional crimped blank cartridges. 

CCI is by far the largest single manufacturer of snake shot ammunition, making cartridges in .22 Long Rifle, .22 Magnum, 9×19mm Luger, .38 Special, .40 Smith & Wesson, .44 Special, .45 ACP, and .45 Colt. CCI rimfire ammunition and nearly all of its centerfire snake-shot cartridges use a hollow plastic capsule which holds the shot, and is often shaped like a bullet to aid in feeding.  The plastic capsule shatters during firing, and allows the shot to disperse after it exits the muzzle.

Garden guns 

"Garden guns" are smooth-bore guns specifically made to fire .22 caliber snake shot or 9mm Flobert shot-shells, and are commonly used by gardeners and farmers for pest control. The guns are especially effective inside barns and sheds, because the snake shot will not injure livestock with a ricochet, or shoot holes in the roof or walls. They are also used for pest control at airports, warehouses, stockyards and the like.

Safety considerations 

 Snake shot may be mistaken for traditional crimped blank cartridges.
 Snake shot may not function properly in semi-automatic firearms causing malfunctions.
 Snake shot may not function properly in handguns and rifles not specifically made for their use.
 Snake shot may not function properly in light weight revolvers, as they may cause "cylinder lock" due to the capsule movement resulting from recoil inertia. However, crimped cases do not exhibit this problem. 
 Snake shot plastic capsules may shatter when being fed from a magazine. Crimped cases do not exhibit this problem but may fail to extract in semi-automatic firearms.
 Unsafe in firearms with suppressors, ported barrels, or ported recoil compensators.
 Snake shot is effective only against snakes, rodents, birds, and other small pests, and only at very close range.

See also 
 Marlin Model 25MG
 Rimfire ammunition
 Snake Charmer (shotgun)
Canister shot

Notes and references

External links 
You Tube video... .22 LR CCI Shotshell
You Tube video...Ruger LCR .22 LR VS Snake
You Tube video...Snake Shot Test (CCI 38/357 shotshells)
You Tube video...Snakes & Shot Cartridges
You tube video...38 special blue vs red shotshell as a self defense load (including slow mo footage)
All CCI shot shell ammunition loads
Handgun Shot Loads Work For Pests But Not Defense, Gun Week, 2005

Ammunition
Pistol and rifle cartridges
Rimfire cartridges
Shotgun shells